Hans Carl Gustav Wahlgren (born 26 June 1937) is a Swedish actor.

Career
Wahlgren grew up in Smedslätten, and debuted in a film in 1945 in Ragnar Falcks shortfilm Indianer och blekansikten. His breakthrough came in the film Raggare in 1959. During eleven seasons he performed in the revue Hagges Revue in Gothenburg. In the revue he made imitations of famous people like Jan Malmsjö, Jarl Kulle, Carl XVI Gustaf  and Claes af Geijerstam. Wahlgren has also performed in several farces and comedies in Stockholm prive theaters, and plays like Oh! Calcutta! and Pippi Longstocking at Folkan. Charleys Tant and Spanska flugan at Vasateatern. During the summer of 2001 he along with Eva Rydberg performed in the comedy Kärlek och lavemang at Fredriksdalsteatern in Helsingborg. He has also done plenty of voice acting in several films such as Charlie and the chocolate factory and Nanny PcPhee,  he provides the voice of Charles Ingvar "Sickan" Jönssons in the computer games Jönssonligan: Jakten på Mjölner and Jönssonligan går på djupet.

Since 2016, he has participated in his daughter Pernilla Wahlgren's reality series Wahlgrens värld which is broadcast on Kanal 5.

Personal life
Wahlgren is the only child of actors Ivar Wahlgren and Nina Scenna. Since 1962, he has been married to actress Christina Schollin; together they have four children: banker Peter Wahlgren, actor Niclas Wahlgren, singer Pernilla Wahlgren, and actor Linus Wahlgren. Wahlgren is of Italian descent on his mother's side.

Filmography
1945 – Indianer och blekansikten
1959 – Raggare!
1960 – Good Friends and Faithful Neighbours
1963 – Det är hos mig han har varit
1963 – Protest
1963 – Fan ger ett anbud (TV-series)
1964 – Henrik IV
1965 – En historia till fredag (TV-series)
1968 – Vindingevals
1968 – Freddy klarar biffen
1969 – Eva – den utstötta
1969 – Régi nyár[3] (engelsk: Summer of Old Times), Baron Miklós Pataky (TV)
1970 – Skräcken har 1000 ögon
1981 – Olsson per sekund eller Det finns ingen anledning till oro (TV)
1983 – Spanska flugan (TV-series) (TV)
1991 – Villfarelser (TV-series)
1991 – Tillbaka till framtiden (TV-series) (voice)
1992 – Rederiet (TV-serie)
1993 – Swat Kats (TV-serie) (voice)
1994 – Spindelmannen (TV-serie) (voice)
1994 – Montana Jones (TV-serie) (voice)
1995 – Landet för länge sedan III: Jakten på det försvunna vattnet (voice)
1996 – Landet för länge sedan IV: Färden till Dimmornas Land (voice)
1997 – Landet för länge sedan V: Den mystiska ön (voice)
1998 – Dr. Dolittle (voice)
1998 – Babe – en gris kommer till stan (voice)
1998 – Landet för länge sedan VI: Hemligheten bakom Saurus-Berget (voice)
1999 – Toy Story 2 (voice)
1999 – Pokémon – Filmen (voice)
1999 – Kurage, den hariga hunden (TV-series) (voice)
2000 – Pokémon 2 - Ensam är stark (röst som Professor Oak)
2000 – Landet för länge sedan VII: Jakten på Himlastenen (voice)
2001 – Landet för länge sedan VIII: När isen kom (voice)
2005 – Nanny McPhee (voice)
2005 – Charlie and the chocolate factory (voice)

References

External links 

Living people
1937 births
Swedish actors
Swedish people of Italian descent